Alexander Penn Wooldridge, usually just A. P. Wooldridge (1847–1930), was the mayor of Austin, Texas from 1909 to 1919. Wooldridge Park and Wooldridge Elementary School are named after him. He led the campaign in the early 1890s to build the Austin Dam across the Colorado River; the dam failed in a flood in 1900.

Wooldridge served as mayor during the Spanish Flu epidemic of 1918. At the height of the epidemic, the city passed an ordinance closing the state university, all public and private schools, and all churches for a period of 30 days.

Education
Wooldridge attended the University of Virginia.

Employment
He was the president of Austin's City National Bank in 1896.

Other Service
He served as the first President of the Board of Trustees of the Austin Independent School District, and is sometimes called "The Father of Public Education in Austin."

References

1847 births
1930 deaths
Politicians from New Orleans
University of Virginia alumni
Texas lawyers
Mayors of Austin, Texas
American bankers